Ikechukwu J. Obiorah  (born 29 August 1961) was elected Senator for the Anambra South Senatorial District of Anambra State, Nigeria, taking office on 29 May 2007. He is a member of the People's Democratic Party (PDP).

Obiorah attended Obafemi Awolowo University, Ife (1981 - 1985) where he obtained a Bachelor of Law degree. He went on to the  Nigerian Law School and became a Barrister at Law in 1986, entering the legal profession. 
After taking his seat in the Senate in June 2007, he was appointed to committees on National Identity Card & Population, Judiciary, Human Rights & Legal Matters and Housing and Urban Development (chairman).

In a mid-term evaluation of Senators in May 2009, ThisDay noted that Obiorah had sponsored bills on the Gully Erosion Control and Prevention Commission, Mortgage Processing, National Housing and Land Titles and Perfection. He also sponsored amendments of the Federal Mortgage Bank Act and the Federal Housing Authority Act. As chairman of the Committee on Housing he led an investigation of sales of Federal Government houses.

Obiorah was involved in a well-publicized case in which Folio Communications, new owners of the Daily Times, alleged that he had issued dud checks as an agent for purchasers of property that Folio was selling.
During the trial it was found that Folio has been "economical with the truth" and Obiorah was cleared and awarded damages. 
He filed a suit against "1st October Publications Ltd", allegedly acting on behalf of Daily Times as a shareholder, but in June 2010 dropped the suit.

References

Living people
1961 births
People from Anambra State
Peoples Democratic Party members of the Senate (Nigeria)
21st-century Nigerian politicians